Vigra is an island in Giske Municipality in Møre og Romsdal county, Norway.  The  island is located north of the islands of Valderøya and Giske, west of the mainland of Haram Municipality, and southwest of the island of Lepsøya (in Haram).  Vigra has a road connection to the mainland via the Vigra Fixed Link, a series of tunnels and bridges that connect all the islands of Giske Municipality to the city of Ålesund to the south.  The island was formerly part of Vigra Municipality.

The island is fairly flat and barren, although most land has been converted to agricultural uses. The largest population centre on the island is the village of Roald on the northern part of the island, on the southeastern edge of Molnesfjellet. Vigra Church is the only church on the island.

Vigra has excellent walking trails along the seashore and over the hills. There are a number of beaches on Vigra including Blimsanden, Rørvikvågen, Blindheimsvika, Roald, and Molnes.  Fishing is a popular activity on the island.  Ålesund Airport is located on the island of Vigra.  On 8 September 2011, the 77-year-old landmark Vigra transmitter, a medium wave broadcasting transmitter, was taken down.

See also

 List of islands of Norway

References

Giske
Islands of Møre og Romsdal